"Get Your Lie the Way You Want It"' is a song written by Billy Mize, which was recorded by American country artist Bonnie Guitar. The song was released as a single in June 1966 and peaked at number fourteen on the Billboard Magazine Hot Country Singles chart. "Get Your Lie the Way You Want It" became Guitar's fourth major hit as a musical artist. It was later released on Guitar's 1966 album entitled, Miss Bonnie Guitar on Dot Records.

Chart performance

References 

1966 singles
Bonnie Guitar songs
1966 songs
Song recordings produced by George Richey
Dot Records singles